As of 15 March 2013, the Bahraini uprising of 2011 and its aftermath resulted in 122 deaths. The number of injuries is hard to determine due to government clamp-down on hospitals and medical personnel. The last accurate estimate for injuries is back to 16 March 2011 and sits at about 2708. The Bahrain Independent Commission of Inquiry concluded that many detainees were subjected to torture and other forms of physical and psychological abuse while in custody, five of whom returned dead bodies. The BICI report finds the government responsible for 20 deaths (November 2011). Opposition activists say that the current number is 88 including 43 who allegedly died as a result of excessive use of tear gas.

Injuries

The total number of injured since the start of the uprising is not known, due to protesters fear of getting arrested in hospital when presenting with protest related injuries. As of 16 March 2011, the total number of 2708 at least. Another 200 injuries were treated by Médecins Sans Frontières outside hospitals, for a total of 2908. A medic who asked to remain anonymous said he secretly treats about 50 injured protesters a week. Among the injured is Nabeel Rajab, a leading human rights activist.
 
Minister of Interior Rashid bin Abdullah Al Khalifa claimed that 395 police officers were injured, four of them allegedly "abducted and tortured".

Deaths

The Bahrain Independent Commission of Inquiry found that there were 35 deaths between 14 February and 15 April 2011 linked to the uprising.  The Commission found the government responsible for 20 of these deaths, protesters responsible for 3, and mobs responsible for 2.  The Commission could not attribute the remaining 10 deaths to a perpetrator. Additionally, the Commission found that there were another 11 deaths potentially linked to the uprising between 16 April and 6 October 2011. Between 7 October 2011 and 18 August 2012, the Bahrain Centre for Human Rights (BCHR) reported 35 deaths linked to the uprising, for a total of 81 deaths. On 23 April, Al Jazeera reported that more than 80 people had died since the start of the uprising. The total number reported, counting all related incidents, even those not mentioned in the BICI report and BCHR is 102 deaths as of 3 November 2012.

Bahrain's Gulf Daily News newspaper reported that anti-government protesters attacked and killed an elderly taxi driver on 13 March. Other local newspapers reported that he was beaten to death by "terrorists". Bahrain's independent Al Wasat newspaper cited witnesses that said the taxi driver died in a traffic accident.  The Bahrain Independent Commission of Inquiry did not report any such death connected to the unrest.  Additionally, a report by the Associated Press, quoting an unnamed security official in Saudi Arabia, stated that a Saudi soldier was shot dead by protesters in Bahrain on 15 March.  Bahrain state television denied this report, and the Commission did not report any such death connected to the unrest.

* The government does not recognise most deaths that were attributed to the use of tear gas.

* A trial for seven protesters accused of killing police is ongoing.

Notable deaths

Ali Abdulhadi Mushaima
Fadhel Al-Matrook
Deaths of Bloody Thursday
Abdulredha Buhmaid
Zakariya Rashid Hassan al-Ashiri
Ali Jawad al-Sheikh
Ahmed Jaber al-Qattan
Mohammed Mushaima

Details

See also 

Human rights reports on Bahraini uprising (2011–present)
Torture in Bahrain
Human Rights in Bahrain
Timeline of the Bahraini uprising (2011–present)

References 

Bahraini uprising of 2011
Deaths during the Bahraini uprising of 2011
Human rights abuses in Bahrain
2011 in Bahrain
2012 in Bahrain
Protest-related deaths